Exmouth Junction is the railway junction where the Exmouth branch line diverges from the London Waterloo to Exeter main line in Exeter, Devon, England. It was for many years the location for one of the largest engine sheds in the former London and South Western Railway. The sidings served the railway's concrete casting factory as well as a goods yard.

History

An engine shed was initially provided at Queen Street but as the number of trains serviced grew too many for the cramped site, a new shed was opened at Exmouth Junction in 1887 on land to the north of the main line. It was rebuilt in brick and concrete in the 1920s by the Southern Railway (SR, which had taken over the LSWR in 1923), and at its peak in the period between 1930 and 1960 it typically had an allocation of over 120 locomotives, as well as being responsible for engines at other depots in the south west. It was closed to steam locomotives in 1965 and finally closed in 1967.

Concrete works were established near the engine shed which converted into a coal concentration depot after closure, whilst the site of the shed itself was turned over to a supermarket in 1979. The coal concentration depot received its last delivery in the late 1990s and has seen little use since. In the 1990s the area was used as a depot for railway maintenance machines and one of the small sheds refurbished by regarding and installation of underframe inspection pits and a refuelling point. After privatisation it was operated by Jarvis Plant, but this had ceased by early 2008 and the shed demolished.

Signal box

The first signal box was built between the main and branch lines in 1875 and from 1887 had to control the entrance to the engine shed which was in front of the box. The line from Yeovil to Exeter was already double track but the Exmouth line had only one until 31 May 1908. The lever frame had to be extended in 1927 to accommodate the extra levers for track alterations to serve the enlarged engine shed. On 15 November 1959 a new brick-built 64-lever signal box with flat roof was brought into use.

Engine shed

The engine shed was opened on 3 November 1887. The main shed was built in corrugated iron and covered 11 tracks. A  turntable was situated behind the shed to turn locomotives, and a range of other facilities were provided including a dormitory for engine crews and a wagon repair workshop.

Work on a replacement shed started in the summer of 1924. A new  turntable was provided, and a mechanical coaling tower with a capacity of  built from concrete replaced the old wooden coaling platform. The first 7 tracks were brought into use in 1926 and the final work was completed in 1929. More than 400 staff were based at the depot, including 240 locomotive crew. The turntable was replaced again in 1947, this time by a  example.

Part of the Southern Region of British Railways from 1948, it was given the shed code 72A. In 1963 it was transferred to the Western Region and the code was changed to 83D. It was closed to steam on 1 June 1965 and the staff transferred elsewhere in 1966, although a few diesels were stabled there until final closure on 6 March 1967.

Goods yards
Exmouth Junction was the main marshalling yard for sorting goods traffic between SR stations in Devon and Cornwall, and points further east. The West Sidings were on the north side of line the between the junction and Blackboy tunnel; the Down Sidings were on the south side of the line to the east of the signal box. There was also a private siding on the south side of the Exmouth branch that served a brick and tile company.

Passenger stations
Although there has never been a railway station known as Exmouth Junction, four suburban stations were opened nearby in the early twentieth century. Only two, St James Park Halt and Polsloe Bridge, remain open.

Mount Pleasant Road Halt

Two wooden platforms were situated in the cutting between Exmouth Junction and Blackboy Tunnel (at ) accessed by paths from Mount Pleasant Road which crossed above the tunnel entrance.  The halt was opened on 26 January 1906 and closed on 2 January 1928.

Whipton Bridge Halt
It was the first of the local stations to close, which happened on 1 January 1923.

Polsloe Bridge Halt

The wooden platforms were situated on top of an embankment but were replaced by concrete ones cast at Exmouth Junction in 1927. Both are still in situ but only one is now used.

St. James Park Halt

Situated between Exmouth Jn and Exeter Central it opened in 1906 as Lions Holt Halt. It was originally built with wooden platforms but later rebuilt with concrete ones cast at Exmouth Jn.

See also

 Southern Railway routes west of Salisbury

References

Transport in Exeter
Rail junctions in England
Railway depots in England
Rail transport in Devon
London and South Western Railway
1861 establishments in England